Howard Shanet (9 November 191819 June 2006) was a U.S. conductor and composer. He was also a music professor at Columbia University, and the chairman of its music department from 1972–1978.

Biography
Howard Shanet was born on 9 November 1918 in Brooklyn, New York, and started his musical career as a cellist, gaining a Bachelor's degree from Columbia in 1939 and a Master's in Musicology in 1941.

After military service in World War II, he studied musical composition with Bohuslav Martinů and Aaron Copland and conducting with Serge Koussevitzky and Fritz Stiedry. During the early 1950s, he was conducting assistant to Leonard Bernstein at the New York Philharmonic. In 1953, he joined Columbia's faculty as Professor of Music, later becoming chairman of its music department from 1972–1978. In later years, he was appointed a professor emeritus.

As a visiting conductor, he appeared with several major U.S. orchestras, including the New York Philharmonic and the Boston Symphony Orchestra. He composed music for orchestra, string quartet, and band. He also conducted performances of operas at Columbia, including the world premiere of Carlos Chávez's The Visitors.

He was the husband of neurophysiologist Bernice Grafstein Shanet, and the father of film and commercial director Laurence Shanet.

Shanet died in Manhattan on June 19, 2006, at age 87.

Publications
In 1956, Shanet wrote the music textbook Learn to Read Music. He wrote Philharmonic: A History of New York's Orchestra in 1975 and wrote an introduction and historical notes to a compilation of early works on the history of the orchestra called Early Histories of the New York Philharmonic.

References
 NYT 2006, "Howard Shanet, 87, a Conductor and Composer Dies", New York Times, 22 June 2006

Notes

Archival Sources
 Finding aid to the Howard Shanet papers at Columbia University. Rare Book & Manuscript Library.

External links

1918 births
2006 deaths
Musicians from Brooklyn
Columbia University faculty
American male conductors (music)
Jewish American musicians
Jewish classical musicians
Classical musicians from New York (state)
20th-century American conductors (music)
20th-century American male musicians
20th-century American Jews
21st-century American Jews
Columbia College (New York) alumni
Columbia Graduate School of Arts and Sciences alumni